The Malaysia Purple League (Malay: Liga Ungu Malaysia) is Malaysia's premier professional badminton league managed by Purple League (M) Sdn. Bhd. The seasons usually run from December to January. The League features local and international players ranging from Olympic medallist, World Champions, former stars and also rising talents. Players from 8 teams will participate in 3 stages on a round robin and play-off format for the coveted Senheng Purple League trophy and championship title. It offers a total prize money of RM1,500,000.

The 2021/2022 season kicked off at Malawati Stadium, Shah Alam on October 1st, while the finals will be held at the Arena of Stars in Resorts World Genting on October 8th and 9th.

History
The league was formed in 2014. The Purple League was formed following the success of professional badminton leagues such as Premier Badminton League (India), China Badminton Super League and Superliga Badminton Indonesia.

Past teams

Results

Performances by teams

Sponsorship
 2014–2015: Kopiko (Kopiko Purple League)
 2015–2016: Resorts World Genting (Resorts World Genting Purple League)
 2016–2019: Senheng Samsung (SS Purple League)
 2021/2022: Senheng redOne (SenHeng redOne Purple League)

References

External links
 

Badminton tournaments in Malaysia
Sports leagues established in 2014
2014 establishments in Malaysia